Taib Mhiri is a secondary school in La Marsa district of Tunis in Tunisia.

History

Schools in Tunisia
Schools in Tunis